"Advice to Youth" is a satirical essay written by Mark Twain in 1882. In his own words, Twain was asked by persons unspecified to write something "to [the] youth." While the exact audience of his speech is uncertain, it is most probably American; in his posthumous collected works, editor's notes have conjecturally assigned the address to the Boston Saturday Morning Club. In the essay, Twain speaks primarily of advice which can be broken into six specific topics. These include: selective obedience towards parents, respecting superiors, the wisdom of going to bed early and waking up early, lying, firearm etiquette, and the importance of good books.

This essay is a classic example of Juvenalian satire. This satirical mode can be seen in Mark Twain's recurrent employment of sarcasm while addressing the youth with his words of wisdom. Interpreted by scholars as a critique of authority, Twain's "Advice to Youth" may have been a topical response to the prohibition of alcohol in Kansas in 1881, a legislative action which many residents found deeply upsetting.

References

Essays by Mark Twain
1882 documents
1882 essays